Spotswood High School is a high school in Penn Laird, Virginia, in shadow of the Massanutten Peak.  As of 2008, it competes in the Virginia High School League.

History
Spotswood High School had its formal beginning in 1973 when the County School Board authorized an Eastern Rockingham building study and requested a report on a proposed new high school for eastern Rockingham County.

A committee, composed of community persons from the Elkton and Montevideo attendance areas, as well as Central Office staff members, three Principals and several teachers from both Montevideo and Elkton High Schools, was organized to develop the education specifications for the proposed new plant. Although the proposal to build the new school was not implemented at this time, the work of the educational specifications committee served as a foundation for the planning of the present school.

During the summer of 1976 the School Board voted to build a senior high school, grades 10-12, to house Montevideo and Elkton High School students. A committee of twenty-one people was appointed to draft a set of educational specifications for the proposed new facility. The committee completed its report during the 1976-1977 school year, and later revised it when a specific starting date for construction was established.

Specific plans for names, nicknames, and colors were developed by a committee of nine persons that made final reports to the School Board in December 1978. The School Board reviewed the report and voted to name to the school the Spotswood Senior High School, in memory of Alexander Spotswood. The Board decided to leave the decision for the school's nickname and colors to the administration and students.

Spotswood High School was established in 1980 as Spotswood Senior High School, serving grades 10-12.  James Upperman was the first principal.  The school was named in honor of Lieutenant-Colonel Alexander Spotswood.  The school colors, blue and gray, were selected from the colors of the two high schools it consolidated in the 1980s: Elkton High School (blue and gold) and Montevideo (maroon and gray).  Elkton's High School color was actually navy blue, however, royal blue was used instead.  The official nickname selected was Trailblazers even though it is rarely used.  In the fall of 1984, Spotswood became a 9-12 school and changed to its present name, Spotswood High School.

In 2009, Rockingham County Public Schools took notice of the increased population in the eastern portion of Rockingham County and opened its fourth high school, East Rockingham High School. The opening of ERHS alleviated the overcrowding problem at Spotswood and cut the enrollment of the school in half.

Current administration
Principal- Robert A. "Rad" Dansey
Asst. Principal- Rebecca Arbaugh, Jeff Bond, & Anneke Martin
Athletic Director- Tim Leach
Resource Officer- Rodrigo

Student body
The enrollment of Spotswood is approaching the 900 mark. The students come from several small towns and unincorporated communities in the area, such as Penn Laird and Keezletown. In 2008, the student body population was reported by the Board of Education to have the following enrollment characteristics. In 2008, the student population was approaching 1500, but after the new East Rockingham High School opened in 2009, the overcrowding problem was alleviated temporarily. In 2020, students from the Grottoes area were moved to East Rockingham High School due to further overcrowding.

Grade

Gender

Sports
The Golf team has been very competitive since Linda Failes took over the head coaching role in 1988. They just wrapped up another District title in 2011 by beating 2nd place Harrisonburg by 66 strokes.

In 2005, the girls basketball team won the Group AA State Championship. In 2010, the girls basketball team finished as Division 4 State Runner-Ups, and in 2011, they finished in the Division 3 State Final Four, losing in the semi-final round to the eventual state champion. They have won back-to-back district titles and were Region III Champions in 2010 and 2011. The girls basketball team is coached by Chris Dodson.

Spotswood cheerleading squad claimed seven straight district titles from 2001-2007, a Region II Championship and runner-up, and two Group AA State Championship Runners-up and a 2007 Region III Finalist. They lost the district title in 2008, however won the crown back in 2009 and 2010. In 2008, they were Region III Runner-Ups and were VHSL AA State Finalists in 2008, 2009, and 2010. 

In 2007, 2008, and 2009 the boys cross country team captured the Massanutten District and Region III titles and placed 7th, 4th, and 2nd respectively in the state.

In 2011, the SHS Girls Tennis team won their 11th straight district title. They also won the Region 3 title in 2008 and 2009, mostly from the talents of their star players, Lauren Pandolfi and Deany Westwood. The Boys Tennis Team is also among the best in the district, they have won back-to-back district titles in 2010 and 2011.

The girls swimming team is also a powerhouse. They have won 8 straight district titles and in 2011 were Region III Champions.

In 2008-2009, the boys basketball team was Massanutten District champs, Region III Champs, and were a state finalist. In the 2009-2010 season, the boys varsity basketball team were the Massanutten District Regular Season Champions, along with being the Region III Division 4 Runners-up, and advanced to the VHSL Division 4 State "Final Four", finishing with a record of 21-5.  In the 2010-2011, the Blazers surprised many people by repeating their performance the previous year with a District Tournament Title, being Region III Runners-up, and again making an appearance to the VHSL Division 3 "Final Four".

VHSL titles
1981 State AA Girls Softball State Championship
1981 State AA Girls Cross Country
1982 State AA Girls Tennis Spring Championship
1993 State AA Boys Basketball Team Championship
1995 State AA Girls Cross Country
1999 State AA Boys Outdoor Track
2005 State AA Girls Basketball Winter Championships

Band

Spotswood High School was named a Virginia Honor Band in 2007-2008. This is the first time the band program has received this honor since 2004-2005. The Spotswood Fine Arts Program has also been nominated for the VMEA Blue Ribbon Award, which honors programs in that have worked towards a superior rating for the Marching Band, Concert Band, and Choir-which Spotswood High School did in 2007-2008.

Spotswood High School, in Penn Laird Virginia, has several musical groups, including concert band, wind ensemble, one percussion ensembles, a jazz ensemble, and the Marching Trailblazers, composed of winds, percussion, and the color guard.

The band program at SHS has won numerous musical awards in many categories for each group, including nine Virginia Honor Band awards, which require a superior rating from each the Symphonic Band and the Marching Band. A Virginia Honors Band award requires that the marching band receive a superior rating (I) at the annual state marching festival, and the highest level concert band of the school also receive a superior (I).

There are usually two or three 'stage' concerts, in some combination of Concert, Symphonic, and Jazz, at Spotswood per year; in addition, the two concert bands perform yearly at the VBODA District Band Festival. The marching band performs at every home football game on Friday nights, as well as various competitions throughout the fall.

Controversy
Spotswood made headlines briefly in 2000, when teacher Jeff Newton, with the backing of freedom of speech advocacy organizations including the ACLU and American Library Association, went to court over an incident covering several weeks in September 1999, when then principal C. James Slye ordered Newton to remove anticensorship pamphlets from his classroom's door that had been posted in observance of Banned Books Week.  The pamphlet in question was a list of books that had been challenged or banned in schools, libraries and bookstores around the country during the late 1990s; these books include several revered and widely read American works, such as Adventures of Huckleberry Finn, The Color Purple, Of Mice and Men and Death of a Salesman, but also include highly sexualized or "vulgar" books that the US Supreme Court found legal to exclude from public schools in the 1982 case of Board of Education v. Pico. ALA | Challenged and Banned Books   The ACLU charged that Spotswood was effectively censoring the anticensorship message of the pamphlet outside of his constitutional rights and blatantly failed to follow the Rockingham County School Board Policy for mediating issues related to controversial and sensitive materials.  The suit was dismissed before the case could be heard, when Newton resigned from the district.

Notable alumni
Daryl Irvine (class of 1983), professional baseball player in Major League Baseball

References

External links

History of Spotswood High School
Spotswood Athletics

Educational institutions established in 1980
Public high schools in Virginia
Schools in Rockingham County, Virginia
1980 establishments in Virginia